Group B of the 2019 CONCACAF Gold Cup took place from 16 to 24 June 2019. The group consisted of Bermuda, co-hosts Costa Rica, Haiti, and Nicaragua. The top two teams, Haiti and Costa Rica, advanced to the knockout stage.

Teams

Notes

Standings

In the quarter-finals:
The winners of Group B, Haiti, advanced to play the runners-up of Group A, Mexico.
The runners-up of Group B, Costa Rica, advanced to play the winners of Group A, Canada.

Matches

Haiti vs Bermuda

Costa Rica vs Nicaragua

Nicaragua vs Haiti

Costa Rica vs Bermuda

Bermuda vs Nicaragua

Haiti vs Costa Rica

Discipline
Fair play points would have been used as tiebreakers if the overall and head-to-head records of teams were tied. These were calculated based on yellow and red cards received in all group matches as follows:
first yellow card: minus 1 point;
indirect red card (second yellow card): minus 3 points;
direct red card: minus 4 points;
yellow card and direct red card: minus 5 points;

Only one of the above deductions were applied to a player in a single match.

References

External links
 

Group B